Phyu Mon is a Burmese writer, photographer, performance artist, and painter who is a renowned artist and one of the very few women in the profession. She is also known for being very much gender-aware.

She is best known as a leading digital artist. She has done a lot of art work and has participated in art exhibitions in many countries such as Italy, Japan, Philippines, Indonesia, Korea, Hong Kong, Singapore and France.

Biography 

Phyu Mon was born on 1960 in Mandalay, Myanmar. She graduated from Mandalay University with B.A (Literature). From 1978 to 1979, she studied painting under the Master artist U Ba Thaw. At 2013, she studied video and film production through a program from the High tech training school of Finland. In 2014, she received her diploma from the National University of Culture and Art.

Careers 

Phyu Mon studied painting under the Master artist U Ba Thaw from 1978 to 1979. In 1997, she started performance art in Mandalay. In 2000, she collaborated with Japanese artist Seiji Shimoda.

Under Mr. Pekka Niskanen, she studied film art from the High tech training school of Finland at 2005. She screened "Blend the world" film in 2007 in Denmark. In 2017, she showed "Blooming Sound" at the Wathann Film Festival. Her films were also screened abroad, in Japan, Indonesia, Philippines and Thailand.

Selected exhibitions
Hope – T.H.E.O. Arts Professionals, Singapore, 2013
Dream Lands – Asia Fine Art Limited, Hong Kong, SAR, 2012

Group exhibitions
Beyond Burma, Bangkok, 2012
One Hundred Years International Days, Hong Kong, 2011
Magnetic Power, Seoul, 2009 
Aye Ko, Aung Myint, Nyein Chan Su, Burma – Speaking Alone, Bangkok, 2009
Myanmar Contemporary Art Festival, Landon, 2010 
Multimedia Art festival, Yangon, 2010
Blend the World, Copenhagen, 2010 
Blue Wind Contemporary art Exhibition, Yangon, 2009 
We are Burma, Berkeley, USA, 2009

Personal life
Phyu Mon married to the famous artist Chan Aye in 1985.

References

Living people
1960 births
Burmese painters
Burmese performance artists
Burmese writers
Mandalay University alumni